HMS Trumpeter is an  P2000-type patrol and training vessel of the British Royal Navy. Trumpeter is assigned to Cambridge University Royal Naval Unit, having previously been the training ship of the Bristol University Royal Naval Unit.

Operational history
HMS Trumpeter served in the Gibraltar Squadron alongside  commencing 1991. With Ranger she was deployed on the Thames for the Thames Diamond Jubilee Pageant to assist in security and partake in the pageant, then later in the same year ''Trumpeter' assisted in the security for the 2012 London Olympics.

See also
 Curriers' Company

Notes

References

External links

 
 
 

 

Archer-class patrol vessels
1988 ships